J. Oliver Macdonald (February 20, 1904 in Paterson, New Jersey - April 14, 1973 in Flemington, New Jersey) was an American athlete, winner of gold medal in 4 × 400 m relay at the 1924 Summer Olympics.

At the Paris Olympics, John Oliver Macdonald ran the third leg in the American 4 × 400 m relay team, which won the gold medal with a new world record of 3.16.0.

John Oliver MacDonald graduated from the University of Pennsylvania in 1927. During his HS and college career he won 91 medals. He was known as Mac during his racing career and later JO by family and friends. He had two children, Judith L. Macdonald and Jay Oliver Macdonald, deceased. He had a successful dental career. He owned purebred Beagles and use to run his dogs in sanctioned field trials. He retired in 1960 and moved to Flemington, NJ and sold real estate.

References

American male sprinters
1904 births
1973 deaths
Sportspeople from Paterson, New Jersey
Track and field athletes from New Jersey
Athletes (track and field) at the 1924 Summer Olympics
Olympic gold medalists for the United States in track and field
Medalists at the 1924 Summer Olympics